is a subway station in Nerima, Tokyo, Japan, operated by Tokyo Metro. Its station numbers for the Tokyo Metro Yurakucho and Fukutoshin Lines are Y-06 and F-06 respectively. Its station number for the Seibu Yūrakuchō Line is SI37.

Lines
Kotake-mukaihara Station is a junction of the following three underground lines.

Station layout
The station consists of two parallel island platforms serving four tracks. Both platforms are equipped with waist-height platform edge doors.

History
The station opened on 1 October 1983.

The station facilities of the Yurakucho and Fukutoshin Lines were inherited by Tokyo Metro after the privatization of the Teito Rapid Transit Authority (TRTA) in 2004.

Waist-height platform edge doors were installed in June 2008.

Station numbering was introduced on all Seibu Railway lines during fiscal 2012, with Kotake-mukaihara Station becoming "SI37".

Passenger statistics
In fiscal 2013, the Seibu station was the 5th busiest on the Seibu network with an average of 154,779 passengers daily. In fiscal 2013, the Tokyo Metro station was used by an average of 154,779 passengers per day. Note that the statistics consider passengers who travel through Kotake-mukaihara station on a through service as users of the station, even if they did not disembark at the station. The passenger figures for previous years are as shown below.

Surrounding area
 Keiai Hospital
 Komone Library
 Tokyo Musashino Hospital

Schools
 Musashino Academia Musicae
 Toshima High School
 Asahigaoka Junior High School
 Kami-itabashi No. 2 Junior School
 Mukaihara Junior High School
 Kami-itabashi No. 2 Elementary School
 Kotake Elementary School
 Mukaihara Elementary School

See also
 List of railway stations in Japan

References

External links

 Tokyo Metro station information 
 Seibu station information 

Railway stations in Japan opened in 1983
Stations of Tokyo Metro
Tokyo Metro Yurakucho Line
Tokyo Metro Fukutoshin Line
Seibu Yūrakuchō Line
Railway stations in Tokyo